Kylan Hamdaoui (born 15 April 1994) is a French rugby union full-back and he currently plays for Stade Français in the French Top 14.

Personal life
Born in France, Hamdaoui is of Algerian descent.

International honours

France (U20)
Six Nations Under 20s Championship winners: 2014

References

External links
L'Équipe profile
ESPN Profile
Stade Français profile

1994 births
Living people
Rugby union players from Paris
French rugby union players
French sportspeople of Algerian descent
Rugby union fullbacks
Biarritz Olympique players
Stade Français players